Stonecoal Creek is a tributary of the West Fork River,  long, in north-central West Virginia in the United States. The stream is believed to have been named in the late 1760s by a group of explorers and settlers (including Jesse Hughes), who found coal in nearby hills and mixed with pebbles in the stream.

Stonecoal Creek rises approximately five miles (8 km) west-northwest of Buckhannon in northwestern Upshur County and flows westwardly into northern Lewis County, where it joins the West Fork River from the east in the city of Weston.  Its principal tributary, the  Right Fork Stonecoal Creek,  was dammed in Lewis County to form Stonecoal Lake in 1972 by Allegheny Energy for the purpose of providing water to a power plant in Harrison County.  The  lake is privately owned, but is managed by the West Virginia Division of Natural Resources, as is a Wildlife Management Area surrounding the lake.

According to the West Virginia Department of Environmental Protection, approximately 77% of Stonecoal Creek's watershed is forested, mostly deciduous.  Approximately 19% is used for pasture and agriculture, and approximately 2% is urban.

Variant spellings
According to the Geographic Names Information System, Stonecoal Creek has also been known historically as:
Stone Coal Creek
Stone Cole Creek
Stone Cole Run

See also
List of West Virginia rivers

References 

Rivers of West Virginia
Rivers of Lewis County, West Virginia
Rivers of Upshur County, West Virginia